The 1974 Bristol bombing was a twin bomb attack carried out by the Provisional IRA in a shopping street in Bristol city centre on 18 December 1974. A bomb was placed in a holdall outside Dixons Photographic shop on Park Street which exploded just before 8 pm. Nine minutes later another more powerful bomb detonated in a dustbin 30 yards away. The blasts injured 20 people and was part of the IRA's bombing campaign in England. The IRA gave a telephone warning for the first bomb but not the second one.

The "come-on" tactic of a second bomb was used weeks before in a bombing in London and had been used many times before in Northern Ireland.

The region was targeted by the IRA for a time. Eight days before Bristol, a bomb exploded in England at The Corridor in Bath, causing severe damage. Four days later a bomb exploded in Newport, South Wales. On 17 December 1978 Bristol was targeted by the IRA again in a bombing near Maggs Department Store in Clifton that injured at least seven people.

See also
Chronology of Provisional Irish Republican Army actions (1970–79)

References

1974 crimes in the United Kingdom
Explosions in 1974
Terrorist incidents in England
Terrorist incidents in the United Kingdom in 1974
December 1974 events in the United Kingdom
1970s in Bristol